We Go to Dream is the sixth album by singer-songwriter Astrid Williamson.

Critical reception

Popmatters thought there was "a golden warmth to these 11 numbers that burns through softly with a deeply meditative glow." Femme Metal Webzine suggested that Williamson "covers the vocals across the range of music here with effortless beauty."

Track listing 
 We Go To Dream
 Loaded Like A Gun
 Hide In Your Heart
 Vermillion
 Ambienza
 Scattered
 Say Goodbye
 Captured
 Home 
 My Beautiful Muse
 Saint Saviour

Personnel and recording details 
 Produced and mixed by James Orr
 Astrid Williamson – vocals, piano, keyboards, string arrangements, electric guitar, acoustic guitars, synths, fiddle, autoharp
 James Orr – drum programming, keyboards, synths
 Steve Parker – electric guitar
 Richard Yale – bass
 Christian Parsons – drums
 Cye Woods – violin

References 

2015 albums
Astrid Williamson albums
One Little Independent Records albums